Boana leucocheila is a species of frog in the family Hylidae that is endemic to Brazil. Its natural habitats are subtropical or tropical moist lowland forests, moist savanna, rivers, freshwater marshes, and intermittent freshwater marshes.

Sources

Boana
Endemic fauna of Brazil
Amphibians of Brazil
Frogs of South America
Amphibians described in 2003
Taxonomy articles created by Polbot